The Ingmar Bergman Award was a Swedish film award, distributed between 1978 and 2007. It was instituted by legendary Swedish film director Ingmar Bergman, as a complement to the Guldbagge Awards. The jury consisted of Ingmar Bergman and the CEO of the Swedish Film Institute. The recipients were awarded a bronze plaque, depicting Bergman's face, and a sum of money. The award was first presented at the 14th Guldbagge Awards, and continued until Bergman's death in 2007.

History 

The award was primarily intended to honour achievements in Swedish film which had not otherwise been considered when the Guldbagge Awards were handed out. As a filmmaker with extensive experience, Ingmar Bergman was aware of how filmmaking requires delicate cooperation between many different people. He knew how important each specialty is to the finished result, and that a film is never better than the weakest link in that complex teamwork. Bergman never forgot the often overlooked categories of film workers. The goal of the award was to pay attention to all the professions which rarely received attention.

The jury was comprised Ingmar Bergman himself and the CEO of the Swedish Film Institute. It was first awarded at the 14th Guldbagge Awards, and was handed out to the film editor Wic Kjellin, by the departing CEO of the Swedish Film Institute, Harry Schein. From this ceremony through the 42nd Guldbagge Awards, the award was presented annually, except for the years 1984, 1989 and 1990. The Award soon covered the entire filmmaking process, as the prize has gone to everything from script students at the Swedish Institute of Dramatic Art, to the legendary projectionist, Henry Nyberg, in 1986.

The award has also been presented to other types of filmmakers: screenwriters, costume designers, makeup artists, script girls, studio managers, production managers, lighting directors and cameramen. Only five performers won the award; among them are Lena Olin, Gunnar Björnstrand and Mikael Persbrandt.

The award 
The award consisted of a sum of money (SEK 60,000 at the end) and a bronze plaque with the Bergmans face in relief, made by the Finnish sculptor Eila Hiltunen. The plaque shows Bergman shyly lowering the gaze. Bergman's vote was the decisive vote when selecting the winner, and he also wrote the often very spiritual justification; the CEO of the Swedish Film Institute presented the award at the ceremony.

Recipients 

 * (Posthumous)

References

External links 
  

1978 establishments in Sweden
2007 disestablishments in Sweden
Awards disestablished in 2007
Awards established in 1978
Ingmar Bergman
Ingmar Bergman
Swedish film awards